Bishop's cap is a common name for several plants and may refer to:

Epimedium, a genus in the family Berberidaceae native to Eurasia
Mitella, a genus in the family Ranunculaceae native to North America and Asia

See also
Astrophytum myriostigma, bishop's cap cactus